There have been three baronetcies held by persons with the surname Verney, one in the Baronetage of England and two in the Baronetage of the United Kingdom. Two of the creations are extant as of 2016.

Overview 

The Verney Baronetcy, of Middle Claydon in the County of Buckingham, was created in the Baronetage of England on 16 March 1661. For more information on this creation, see the Earl Verney.

The Calvert, later Verney Baronetcy, of Claydon House in the County of Buckingham, was created in the Baronetage of the United Kingdom on 3 December 1818 for General Harry Calvert, for many years Adjutant-General of the Forces. The second Baronet assumed in 1827 the surname of Verney in lieu of Calvert, having succeeded to the Verney estates through his cousin Richard Calvert, who married Mary (née Nicholson), the widow of the Hon. John Verney, eldest son of Ralph Verney, 1st Earl Verney. Verney sat as Liberal Member of Parliament for Buckingham and Bedford. The third Baronet was a captain in the Royal Navy and also represented Buckingham in the House of Commons as a Liberal. The fourth Baronet was also a Liberal politician and served as Parliamentary Secretary to the Board of Agriculture and Fisheries from 1914 to 1915. He was succeeded by his son, the fifth Baronet. He was a member of the Buckinghamshire County Council and served as Vice-Lieutenant and High Sheriff of Buckinghamshire. As of 2014 the title is held by his only son, the sixth Baronet, who succeeded in 2001.

Several other members of the Verney family have also gained distinction. George Hope Lloyd-Verney (who assumed the additional surname of Lloyd in 1888), third son of the second Baronet, was a colonel in the Army. He wrote the booklet Four-Handed Chess which was published in 1881. His son Sir Harry Lloyd-Verney was Treasurer and Private Secretary to Queen Mary. His son Gerald Lloyd-Verney (1900–1957) was a major-general in the Irish Guards. His son Peter Vivian Verney (b. 1930) is an author. The Right Reverend Stephen Edmund Verney, younger son of the fourth Baronet, was Bishop of Repton (Suffragan Bishop for the Diocese of Derby). His Honour Sir Laurence John Verney, youngest son of the fourth Baronet, was a judge.

The family seat is Claydon House, near Aylesbury Vale, Buckinghamshire.

The Verney Baronetcy, of Eaton Square in the City of Westminster, was created in the Baronetage of the United Kingdom on 16 July 1946 for Ralph Verney, Military Secretary to the Viceroy of India from 1916 to 1921 and Secretary to the Speaker of the House of Commons from 1921 to 1955.  He was the son of Frederick William Verney, youngest son of the second Baronet of the 1818 creation.  He was succeeded by his son, the second Baronet. He was a painter, illustrator and author.  As of 2007 the title is held by his only son, the third Baronet, who succeeded in 1993. However, he does not use his title. As of 28 February 2014 the present Baronet has not successfully proved his succession and is therefore not on the Official Roll of the Baronetage, with the baronetcy considered dormant since 1993.

David Verney, younger son of the first Baronet, was High Sheriff of Cornwall in 1964.

Verney baronets, of Middle Claydon (1661)
see the Earl Verney

Verney baronets, of Claydon House (1818)

Sir Harry Calvert, 1st Baronet (died 1826)
Sir Harry Verney, 2nd Baronet (1801–1894)
Sir Edmund Hope Verney, 3rd Baronet (1838–1910)
Lt.-Col. Sir Harry Calvert Williams Verney, 4th Baronet, DSO (1881–1974)
Sir Ralph Bruce Verney, 5th Baronet, KBE (1915–2001)
Sir Edmund Ralph Verney, 6th Baronet (born 1950)

The heir apparent is the present holder's son Andrew Nicholas Verney (born 1983).

Verney baronets, of Eaton Square (1946)
Sir Ralph Verney (1879–1959)
Sir John Verney, 2nd Baronet (1913–1993), English artist and writer
Sir John Sebastian Verney, 3rd Baronet (born 1945) (does not use the title)

There is no heir to the baronetcy.

References

Kidd, Charles, Williamson, David (editors). Debrett's Peerage and Baronetage (1990 edition). New York: St Martin's Press, 1990.

Baronetcies in the Baronetage of the United Kingdom
Extinct baronetcies in the Baronetage of England
1661 establishments in England